El barrendero (in English, The Street Sweeper) is a 1982 Mexican comedy film directed by Miguel M. Delgado and starring Cantinflas and María Sorté. It has been cited as an example of a "Mexploitation" film. It is Cantinflas's last film, ending a career that had lasted since 1936.

Plot
Napoleón (Cantinflas) is a humble street sweeper who flirts with all the maids in the neighborhood where he works (all of whom call him affectionately "Don Napo"), of which Chipinita (María Sorté) stands out. Napoleon ends up being the only witness to the theft of a valuable painting, and he is threatened by the thieves of the painting and also becomes a suspect.

Cast
Cantinflas as Napoleón "Don Napo"
María Sorté as Chipinita
Úrsula Prats as Lupita
Luz Elena Silva
Eduardo Alcaraz as Don Chafas
Federico González as Supervisor Molina
Antonio Zubiaga as Skinny Thief
Luz María Rico as Rosita
Sara Guasch as Blonde woman at party
José Luis Avendaño as Mendoza
Roxana Chávez as Chabelita
Alberto Catalá as Basurita
Alfredo Gutiérrez as Police Deputy
Adalberto Arvizu as Thief (as Alberto Arvizu)
Mariela Flores
Gerardo del Castillo as General Secretary
Lina Michel as French Maid
Evita Muñoz "Chachita" as Pachita
Julio Monterde as Party Guest (uncredited)
José Nájera as Father of abandoned baby (uncredited)
Elvia Pedroza as Doña Chumina, porter (uncredited)
Marcelo Villamil as Party Guest (uncredited)

References

Bibliography
Amador, María Luisa; Ayala Blanco, Jorge. Cartelera cinematográfica, 1980–1989. UNAM, 2006.
Rohrer, Seraina. La India María: Mexploitation and the Films of María Elena Velasco. University of Texas Press, 2017.

External links

1982 comedy films
1982 films
Mexican comedy films
Films directed by Miguel M. Delgado
1980s Mexican films